Shine is the soundtrack to the 2006 Turkish film Küçük kiyamet (“Little Apocalypse“). Kevin Moore wrote the music while he was living in Istanbul, Turkey.  The album was funded by fans and released via Kickstarter.com on CD in 2011.

Track listing

Credits
Written and performed by Kevin Moore
Vocals by Bige Akdeniz
Cover artwork by Conte di San Pietro

External links
 Kickstarter page for Shine
 IMDB page for Küçük kiyamet

2010 albums
Kickstarter-funded albums